The following highways are numbered 47:

International
 Asian Highway 47
 European route E47

Australia 
 East West Link (proposed)

Canada
 Alberta Highway 47
 Ontario Highway 47
 Saskatchewan Highway 47

France
 A47 autoroute

India
  National Highway 47 (India)

Iran
 Road 47

Iraq
Highway 47 (Iraq)

Japan
 Japan National Route 47

Korea, South
 National Route 47

New Zealand
 New Zealand State Highway 47

Poland 
  unbuilt expressway S47
  National road 47

United Kingdom
 British A47 (Birmingham-Great Yarmouth)

United States
 Alabama State Route 47
 Arkansas Highway 47 (former)
 California State Route 47
 Colorado State Highway 47
 Connecticut Route 47
 Florida State Road 47
 Georgia State Route 47
 Idaho State Highway 47
 Illinois Route 47
 Indiana State Road 47
 Iowa 47 (former)
 K-47 (Kansas highway)
 Kentucky Route 47
 Louisiana Highway 47
 Louisiana State Route 47 (former)
 Maryland Route 47
Maryland Route 47A
 Massachusetts Route 47
 M-47 (Michigan highway)
 Minnesota State Highway 47
 County Road 47 (Dakota County, Minnesota)
 Mississippi Highway 47
 Missouri Route 47
 Montana Highway 47
 Nebraska Highway 47
 Nebraska Spur 47A
 Nevada State Route 47 (former)
 New Hampshire Route 47
 New Jersey Route 47
 County Route 47 (Monmouth County, New Jersey)
 County Route 47 (Ocean County, New Jersey)
 New Mexico State Road 47
 New York State Route 47 (former)
 County Route 47 (Cattaraugus County, New York)
 County Route 47 (Dutchess County, New York)
 County Route 47 (Erie County, New York)
 County Route 47 (Genesee County, New York)
 County Route 47 (Greene County, New York)
 County Route 47 (Jefferson County, New York)
 County Route 47 (Ontario County, New York)
 County Route 47 (Otsego County, New York)
 County Route 47 (Putnam County, New York)
 County Route 47 (Rensselaer County, New York)
 County Route 47 (Rockland County, New York)
 County Route 47 (Schenectady County, New York)
 County Route 47 (St. Lawrence County, New York)
 County Route 47 (Suffolk County, New York)
 County Route 47 (Ulster County, New York)
 County Route 47 (Warren County, New York)
 North Carolina Highway 47
 North Dakota Highway 47 (former)
 Ohio State Route 47
 Oklahoma State Highway 47
 Oklahoma State Highway 47A
 Oregon Route 47
 Pennsylvania Route 47 (former)
 South Carolina Highway 47
 South Dakota Highway 47
 South Dakota Highway 47W (former)
 Tennessee State Route 47
 Texas State Highway 47
 Texas State Highway Loop 47
 Farm to Market Road 47
 Texas Park Road 47
 Utah State Route 47 (former)
 Virginia State Route 47
 Virginia State Route 47 (1928-1930) (former)
 Virginia State Route 47 (1930-1933) (former)
 West Virginia Route 47
 West Virginia Route 47 (1920s) (former)
 Wisconsin Highway 47

Territories
 Puerto Rico Highway 47

See also
A47